Pivotal may refer to:

 Pivotal CRM, a customer relationship management software system offered by Aptean
 Pivotal Labs, a software company
 Pivotal Tracker, a project management product offered by Pivotal Labs
 Pivotal Software, a software company, a spin off from VMware and EMC Corporation
 Pivotal (horse), British thoroughbred racehorse

See also
 Pivot (disambiguation)